Mohammad Gholamin Noveirsari (born 11 February 1986 in Bandar-e Anzali, Iran) is an Iranian football player.

He was also a member of Iran national under-23 football team.

Club statistics

 Assist Goals

External links
Persian League Profile

Iranian footballers
1986 births
Living people
People from Bandar-e Anzali
Persian Gulf Pro League players
Azadegan League players
Malavan players
Paykan F.C. players
Sanat Naft Abadan F.C. players
Steel Azin F.C. players
Payam Mashhad players
F.C. Aboomoslem players
Gahar Zagros players
Asian Games bronze medalists for Iran
Asian Games medalists in football
Footballers at the 2006 Asian Games
Association football forwards
Medalists at the 2006 Asian Games
Sportspeople from Gilan province
21st-century Iranian people